The  is a 9.4 km railway line owned by Iyotetsu. The line connects Matsuyama with the port town of Mitsuhama in Ehime Prefecture, Japan. The line runs in the northwest direction from Matsuyama City Station, terminating at Takahama Station. 

Opening in 1888, this is the first railroad in Shikoku. There is a planned extension to Matsuyama Port to the north of Takahama Station, which is currently served by a bus.

Operations
The line is electrified with overhead lines and is double-tracked for the entire line, except for the portion between Takahama Station and Baishinji Station. 

The majority of rail services continue past Matsuyama City Station on the Yokogawara Line to Yokogawara Station. Trains arrive roughly every fifteen minutes.

Stations
All stations are located in Matsuyama, Ehime Prefecture. Although not constructed yet, Matsuyama Tourist Port Station is also given a number designation, IY00.

References

Iyotetsu Takahama Line
Railway lines in Japan
Rail transport in Ehime Prefecture
Railway lines opened in 1888